is the third album from the Japanese girl idol group Cute. It was released in regular and limited editions on March 12, 2008 on the Zetima Records label. The regular has catalogue number EPCE-5547 and the limited edition, which includes a bonus DVD, has catalogue number EPCE-5545~46.

The album debuted at number 10 in the Oricon Weekly Albums Chart, staying in the chart for 4 weeks.

As of 2011, it still remains C-ute's best selling album.

Track listing 
All songs written and composed by Tsunku.

CD 
 
 
 Performed by Maimi Yajima and Airi Suzuki
 
 
 
 
 
 Performed by Chisato Okai and Kanna Arihara
 
 
 Performed by Saki Nakajima and Mai Hagiwara
 
 Performed by Erika Umeda with °C-ute Gasshōdan

DVD 
 LaLaLa Shiawase no Uta (Hello! Project 2008 Winter ~Kettei! Hello☆Pro Award '08~ live version)
 LaLaLa Shiawase no Uta (Erika Umeda close-up version)
 LaLaLa Shiawase no Uta (Maimi Yajima close-up version)
 LaLaLa Shiawase no Uta (Saki Nakajima close-up version)
 LaLaLa Shiawase no Uta (Airi Suzuki close-up version)
 LaLaLa Shiawase no Uta (Chisato Okai close-up version)
 LaLaLa Shiawase no Uta (Mai Hagiwara close-up version)
 LaLaLa Shiawase no Uta (Kanna Arihara close-up version)

Charts

References

External links 
 3rd ~Love Escalation~ entry on the Up-Front Works official website

2008 albums
Cute (Japanese idol group) albums
Zetima albums